The Sigma 4.5mm f/2.8 EX DC circular fisheye is a photographic lens manufactured by Sigma Corporation. It is a circular fisheye lens, designed to project a 180-degree field of view in all directions onto a circular image.  It is the first such lens to provide the complete circular fisheye effect on crop factor digital SLR cameras, which do not have a full 36x24mm sensor.  This lens is available in Canon, Nikon, Sigma, Pentax and Sony mounts.

This lens projects a 13mm image circle, which fits nicely in a Micro Four Thirds system frame, but it must be adapted from one of the available APS-C mounts (listed above) in order to work on a Micro Four Thirds body.

See also
List of Nikon compatible lenses with integrated autofocus-motor
 Sigma 10mm f/2.8 EX DC Fisheye HSM lens

References 

004.5mm f/2.8 EX DC circular fisheye
Fisheye lenses